Expo Center is a metro station of Line 6 of the Hangzhou Metro in China. It was opened on 30 December 2020, together with the Line 6. It is located in the Xiaoshan District of Hangzhou, near the Hangzhou International Exhibition Center, which was the venue of 2016 G20 Hangzhou Summit.

Gallery

References 

Railway stations in Zhejiang
Railway stations in China opened in 2020
Hangzhou Metro stations